Peter G Gow was a social anthropologist, renowned for his work in Amazonia.  He was a Professor of Social Anthropology at the University of St Andrews and has previously taught at the London School of Economics.

Life
Pete Gow was born in Scotland to James and Helen Gow in 1958. He died on 18 May 2021.

Works
 An Amazonian Myth and its History (2001)
 Of Mixed Blood - Kinship and History in Peruvian Amazonia (1991)

Universities
 Manchester University
 London School of Economics
 University of St Andrews

Notes

External links
 http://www.st-andrews.ac.uk/anthropology/dept/staff/?staffid=140

1958 births
Academics of the London School of Economics
Alumni of the London School of Economics
Scottish anthropologists
British ethnologists
Living people